The 2022 Calderdale Metropolitan Borough Council election took place on 5 May 2022 to elect members of Calderdale Metropolitan Borough Council in England. One third of councillors — 17 out of 51, plus one vacancy in Ovenden ward were up for election. The election took place alongside other local elections across the United Kingdom.

In the previous council election in 2021, Labour maintained its control of the council, holding 28 seats after the election. The Conservatives won more of the seats that were up for election, but remained the main opposition with 16 seats. The remaining seats were held by the Liberal Democrats and independent councillors.

Background 

The Local Government Act 1972 created a two-tier system of metropolitan counties and districts covering Greater Manchester, Merseyside, South Yorkshire, Tyne and Wear, the West Midlands, and West Yorkshire starting in 1974. Calderdale was a district of the West Yorkshire metropolitan county. The Local Government Act 1985 abolished the metropolitan counties, with metropolitan districts taking on most of their powers as metropolitan boroughs. The West Yorkshire Combined Authority was established in 2014 and began electing the mayor of West Yorkshire in 2021.

Calderdale Council was under no overall control with Conservative, Liberal Democrat and Labour leaders until the Labour Party achieved a majority of seats in the 2019 election, when they gained four seats to hold 28 of the council's 51 seats. In the most recent election in 2021, nineteen seats were up for election: 17 as part of the normal thirds cycle and two concurrent by-elections to fill vacant seats. The Conservatives made gains at the expense of the Liberal Democrats and independents to come first in seats and share of the vote, winning nine of the nineteen seats up for election on 39.0% of the vote, while Labour won eight with 37.3% of the vote and the Liberal Democrats won the remaining two seats with 11.3% of the vote. The Green Party received 8.3% of the vote but won no seats. Labour maintained its majority on the council.

A Labour councillor for the Park ward, Mohammad Naeem, died in July 2021. Around the same time, the independent councillor for Ryburn, Rob Holden, resigned. By-elections to fill both vacancies were held in September 2021, with the Labour candidate Shazad Fazal holding Park and the Conservative candidate Felicity Issott gaining Ryburn. The former Conservative councillor Roger Taylor, who had been suspended from his party in 2019 for making Islamophobic social media posts, was later permanently suspended from his party.

Positions up for election in 2022 were last elected in 2018. In that election, Labour won ten seats, the Conservatives won four, the Liberal Democrats won two and independent candidates won one seat.

Electoral process 
The council elects its councillors in thirds, with a third being up for election for three consecutive years and no election in the fourth year. The election will take place by first-past-the-post voting, with wards generally being represented by three councillors, with one elected in each election year to serve a four-year term.

All registered electors (British, Irish, Commonwealth and European Union citizens) living in Calderdale aged 18 or over will be entitled to vote in the election. People who live at two addresses in different councils, such as university students with different term-time and holiday addresses, are entitled to be registered for and vote in elections in both local authorities. Voting in-person at polling stations will take place from 07:00 to 22:00 on election day, and voters will be able to apply for postal votes or proxy votes in advance of the election.

Campaign 
The Conservative group leader, Steven Leigh, said he was aiming to gain seats with the purpose of replacing the Labour council after the 2023 election.

Council results

Note that due to by-elections being run in some wards, electors in those wards had two votes. This means the change in percentage of votes is not representative of the true swing.

Council Composition
Prior to the election the composition of the council was:

After the election the composition of the council was:

Ward results

Brighouse

The incumbent was Howard Blagbrough for the Conservative Party.

Calder

The incumbent was Sarah Courtney for the Labour Party.

Elland

The incumbent was Angie Gallagher for the Labour Party.

Greetland and Stainland

The incumbent was Jacob Cook for the Conservative Party.
The percentage change is expressed compared to the 2018 election when the late Marilyn Greenwood was elected for the Liberal Democrats. Jacob Cook was elected as the second councillor in 2021.

Hipperholme and Lightcliffe

The incumbent was Colin Raistrick, an Independent, who stepped down at this election.
The swing between Conservative & Labour is 6.8% to Conservative.

Illingworth and Mixenden

The incumbent was Dan Sutherland for the Labour Party.

Luddendenfoot

The incumbent was Scott Patient for the Labour Party.

Northowram and Shelf

The incumbent was Stephen Baines for the Conservative Party who was the deputy leader of the Conservative group at the time of the election.

This was the only ward to increase its turnout compared to 2018.

Ovenden

The incumbents were Helen Rivron for the Labour Party and Bryan Smith for the Labour Party who was standing down due to health reasons.

Park

The incumbent was Mohammed Fazal for the Labour Party.
The second place candidate in 2018 was Surraya Bibi standing as an Independent, having previously been part of the Labour party. The swing from Independent to Labour was 21.6%.

Rastrick

The incumbent was Regan Dickenson for the Conservative Party.

Ryburn

The incumbent was Steven Leigh for the Conservative Party.

Second place in 2018 was Robert Holden standing as an Independent. The swing in the box is expressed between Conservative & Labour. The swing from Independent to Conservative was 21.5%.

Skircoat

The incumbent was Colin Hutchinson for the Labour Party.

Sowerby Bridge

The incumbent was Dot Foster for the Labour Party.

Todmorden

The incumbent was Susan Press for the Labour Party who stood down at this election.

Town

The incumbent was Bob Metcalfe for the Labour Party who stood down at this election.

Warley

The incumbent was Amanda Parsons-Hulse for the Liberal Democrats.

References 

Calderdale Council elections
Calderdale
2020s in West Yorkshire